Csonka may refer to:

Csonka (surname), people with this name, including:
Csonka (automobile), a Hungarian automobile manufactured by János Csonka in Budapest from 1909 to 1912
131762 Csonka, a main-belt minor planet